Daniel Thrasher is an American YouTuber and musician. He primarily uploads piano-based comedy sketches to his self-titled YouTube channel. , his main YouTube channel has accumulated more than 629 million views with more than 3.48 million subscribers.

Career
Thrasher created his main YouTube channel, then titled muffinman3000, on January 5, 2007, with the first video being uploaded on December 1, 2011.

On November 13, 2012, Thrasher uploaded a video titled "How I Accidentally Wrote 'The Office' Theme Song", in which he explains how, after he got a new piano, he was testing a chord progression that sounded familiar, before he realized it was the theme tune to The Office.

A few years later, when Thrasher was in college, the video went viral, and now has over 21 million views and is the third most-viewed video on his channel .

In 2019, Thrasher quit his job as a barista to pursue YouTube as a full-time career. By that point, he had accrued over one million subscribers. During the COVID-19 lockdowns, Thrasher continued to post videos. As a result, he almost tripled his amount of subscribers. He was able to increase the size of his operation to a four-person team.

In 2021, American comedy duo Rhett & Link of Good Mythical Morning announced that a fund called the "Mythical Creator Accelerator" had been created to invest over $5 million into creators, through their production company Mythical Entertainment. Thrasher was the second beneficiary of the fund in April 2022.

On December 1, 2021, Thrasher performed a one-day show at the Palace Theatre in Los Angeles, entitled Daniel Thrasher: Laugh or Die. Thrasher also embarked on a five-show tour in June 2022, entitled Daniel Thrasher Live, traveling to three states across the Midwest.

Thrasher is set to be a featured creator at VidCon in June 2023 and is set to appear in the US remake of British television Friday Night Dinner, titled Dinner With The Parents, to be released on Amazon Freevee.

Awards and nominations

Notes

References

External links
 
 
 

21st-century American comedians
American YouTubers
Comedy YouTubers
Music YouTubers
1993 births
Living people